Maureen Koech (born 21 May 1989) is a Kenyan actress, songwriter and singer. She appears in the KTN's Lies that Bind.

Early life
Maureen Koech was born on May 21, 1989. Raised in Nairobi, she went to Nakuru High School. She later joined Strathmore University  between 2009 and 2013, where she enrolled in Business Information and Technology (BBIT) and later ventured into acting.

Career

Acting career

Early career beginnings; Strathmore University, Changing Times 
Koech began her acting career doing stage performances at the Alliance Française. Aside from featuring in a number of productions, she starred in Lies that Bind, a Kenyan TV drama series that won the award for best TV series at the 2012 Kalasha film and television awards. At Strathmore University, she joined Drama School (DRAMSCO), where she participated in drama activities. She made her debut in campus television series Changing Times back in 2010, where she played Shiks. She worked with Ian Mugoya, Nice Githinji, Kevin Ndege and the rest of the ensemble cast.

2011-2014; Lies that Bind 
In 2011, she auditioned at the Kenya National Theatre and was picked as one of the main cast for the soap opera Lies that Bind. She played Patricia, a young bubbly girl who is in the process of rediscovering herself. Her performance in the show earned her the Best Supporting Actress in the Africa Magic Viewers Choice Award in 2013. In 2014, she featured in a short film, Sticking Ribbons.

Music career
Apart from being an actress, she has also ventured into the music industry. She recorded her first demo after high school, then took a break from music to discover herself as a musician. She does urban pop and has one single under her stage name Mokko. She plays guitar. She released her first single, "No Letting", in 2014.

Filmography

Television

Discography

Singles

References

External links

1989 births
Living people
Kenyan television actresses
21st-century Kenyan actresses
Soap opera actresses
21st-century Kenyan women singers
Kenyan film actresses